"All Around the World" is a song by English singer, songwriter and actress Lisa Stansfield from her debut studio album, Affection (1989). It was released as the album's second single on 16 October 1989 by Arista Records. It was written by Stansfield, Ian Devaney and Andy Morris, and produced by Devaney and Morris. The song received favorable reviews from music critics. Songwriters, Stansfield, Devaney and Morris, received the 1989 Ivor Novello Award for Best Song Musically and Lyrically. "All Around the World" was also nominated for the Grammy Award for Best Female Pop Vocal Performance at the 33rd Annual Grammy Awards. Additionally, Stansfield was nominated for the Grammy Award for Best New Artist. The song became the first of two UK number-one singles for Stansfield (the second being an appearance on George Michael and Queen's "Five Live" EP) and the first of eight top-ten hits she would achieve in that country.

In 2003, "All Around the World" was included on Biography: The Greatest Hits. In 2014, the remixes of "All Around the World" were included on the deluxe 2CD + DVD re-releases of Affection, Face Up and on the People Hold On ... The Remix Anthology compilation (also on The Collection 1989–2003).

Background and release
 Stansfield co-wrote the lyrics of "All Around the World" with her former bandmates Ian Devaney and Andy Morris from Blue Zone. In a 2019 interview, Stansfield recalled the process when the song was made: 
The song came down quickly and on low budget. The vocal part was made in only two takes and real strings were put on afterwards. The song is largely influenced by American singer-songwriter Barry White. As a tribute to him, they made a spoken intro on "All Around the World" like the one on the album version of White's "Let the Music Play", only shorter.

The song was released as the second European single on 16 October 1989. It was remixed by Yvonne Turner, Eddie Gordon, Paul Witts and Steve Anderson. In North America, "All Around the World" was released as the first single on 15 January 1990 and included remixes created by The 45 King and Richard Sweret. In Japan, the single was released on 7 February 1990. Stansfield went on to become the first white British woman to reach number-one on the Billboard R&B chart, the American black music chart. A music video was made to accompany the song, directed by Philip Richardson.

Critical reception
The song received favorable reviews from many music critics. Bill Coleman from Billboard felt it "sports that all-too-familiar Soul II Soul-ish feel but it's the lyric and Stansfield's emotive vocal which take it to the next level." J.D. Considine from The Baltimore Sun complimented her "warm, emotive voice", "summoning the vocal authority of an Anita Baker or Dionne Warwick with "All Around the World"." Ernest Hardy from Cashbox stated that "it’s her earthy vocals swarthed in whirling strings and placed against a soft beat that sets toes tapping, shoulders swaying and heads bopping." He added that "there’s no denying that Stansfield has released one of 1990s best singles. What a way to start the year." A reviewer from The Dallas Morning News called it "infectious". Greg Sandow from Entertainment Weekly found that the singer "might be hurtling right to the top of the charts. Can we listen to her soberly? We drive each other crazy, she sings, in a voice like a suffocated flame. No two people ever felt this way, she wants her lucky lover to know." Swedish Expressen wrote that Stansfield "sings like an older black woman. An old-fashioned kind of song, very good." David Quantick from NME said that "Stansfield's voice is pretty remarkable. There's a bit on "All Around the World" where she sounds like all the Jackson Five at the same time." 

Paul Simper from Number One named it "the most super swooshy dance single of the year". A reviewer from Reading Eagle described it as a "hauntingly seductive" track that "revolves around a classic hook." Amy Linden for Rolling Stone remarked that Stansfield "accomplishes what she has to with disarming ease. The way she reaches for the high notes ("What Did I Do to You?") and the way her voice slinks around the line so-oo sad in "All Around the World" show that this is someone who knows her roots – even if they aren't really hers." Sian Pattenden from Smash Hits wrote, "Its quite similar to her last hit "This Is the Right Time" in that it's a slower kind of dance "vibe" which is all rather pleasant." Steven Daly from Spin viewed it as "a sensational piece of self-invention around the kind of voice that vaporizes all criticism." John Nichols from Toledo Blade felt it is "dazzling", and stated that Stansfield's voice "is everywhere it is should be – whispering, soaring, going deep and then going loud. There is no doubt she owns a musical gift." An editor from USA Today commented that "All Around the World" "has knocked the socks off listeners ... well, all around the world."

Commercial performance
"All Around the World" became a very successful single, peaking at number-one in many countries. In Europe, it reached the top of the chart in Austria (for six weeks), Netherlands (four weeks), Norway (three weeks), United Kingdom (two weeks), Spain (two weeks) and Belgium (one week). It also peaked at number two in Italy and West Germany, number three in Ireland and Switzerland, number four in Sweden, and number seven in Finland.

In the United States, "All Around the World" reached number three on the Billboard Hot 100, and also topped for two weeks the Hot Black Singles and Hot Dance Club Songs charts. Stansfield became the first white woman to top the now-Hot R&B/Hip-Hop Songs chart since Teena Marie scored in 1988 with "Ooo La La La." On the Adult Contemporary Singles, the song peaked at number seven.

In Canada, "All Around the World" reached number three on the Top Singles Chart and Adult Contemporary Chart, and peaked at number one on the Dance/Urban Chart. "All Around the World" also reached number nine in Australia and number ten in New Zealand. The single was certified Platinum in the United States for selling over one million copies and Gold in the United Kingdom, Australia, Germany, Austria and Sweden.

Retrospective response
In an 2019 retrospective review, Matthew Hocter from Albumism declared the song as "sultry and heartbreakingly beautiful". AllMusic editor Alex Henderson described it as a "melancholy, Barry White-influenced single" and noted further that "it was obvious that not since Teena Marie had a white female singer performed R&B so convincingly." Tom Ewing of Freaky Trigger said in 2010, that "All Around the World" "is a song about guilt and loss, it's no surprise she doesn't sound quite so joyful."

Music video
The accompanying music video of "All Around the World" was directed by Philip Richardson. It was nominated as Best New Artist in a Video on the MTV Video Music Awards in 1990. The video was later published on Stansfield's official YouTube channel in October 2012. It had generated more than 61 million views as of January 2023.

The video opens with a close-up of Stansfield in black-and-white speaking the intro. As the song begins, the camera circle around Stansfield, now in colours. The backdrop is a world map. Her hair is very short, she wears red lipstick and her famous kiss curls. Next she sits outdoors in the rain, performing on the stairs in front of a house. Other scenes shows Stansfield singing, while she rotates in the middle of a ring of men standing next to each other as the camera follows her round. Towards the end, she stands in the rain and sings as the raindrops are falling on her face.

1992, 2003 and 2014 versions
In 1992, Stansfield re-recorded "All Around the World" as a duet with Barry White. This version was included on her single "Time to Make You Mine" (March 1992). All artist royalties from this record were donated to the charity Trading Places. The Peter Stuart-directed music video for the duet version was also released. In November 1992, this duet version was also included on White's retrospective box set, Just for You. In 2003, Stansfield released Biography: The Greatest Hits which was promoted by her signature song, "All Around the World." In the United States, the promotional single included remixes created by Norty Cotto and reached number thirty-four on the Billboards Hot Dance Club Songs. The digital promo single with remix by Junior Vasquez was also released.

In 2014, the remixes of "All Around the World" were included on the deluxe 2CD + DVD re-releases of Affection, Face Up and on the People Hold On ... The Remix Anthology compilation (also on The Collection 1989–2003). Affection re-release includes: Long Version, Around the House Mix and Runaway Love Mix, all from 1989. Face Up 2014 re-release features remixes from 2003: Norty Cotto Remix, Norty's World Dub and Junior Vasquez Earth Anthem. Finally, People Hold On...The Remix Anthology includes: The Global Quest from 1989, American Club Remix from 1990 and previously unreleased Attack Mix by The 45 King.

Track listings

 Australian/European 7" single / Japanese CD single
"All Around the World" – 4:22
"Wake Up Baby" – 3:58

 European CD single
"All Around the World" – 4:22
"All Around the World" (Long Version) – 7:02
"Wake Up Baby" – 3:58
"The Way You Want It" (Edit) – 4:16

 Australian/European 12" single
"All Around the World" (Long Version) – 7:02
"Wake Up Baby" – 3:58
"The Way You Want It" (Edit) – 4:16

 European 12" single (Remix)
"All Around the World" (Around the House Mix) – 6:03
"This Is the Right Time" (Accapella) – 2:30
"All Around the World" (Runaway Love Mix) – 4:37
"The Way You Want It" – 4:56

 UK promotional 12" single
"All Around the World" (The Global Quest) – 6:17

 US 7" single
"All Around the World" – 4:21
"Affection" – 5:50

 US 12" single
"All Around the World" (Long Version) – 7:02
"All Around the World" (American Club Remix) – 11:48
"Affection" – 5:50

 US promotional 12" single
"All Around the World" (Long Version) – 7:02
"All Around the World" (Single Version) – 4:21
"All Around the World" (American Club Remix) – 11:48
"All Around the World" (American Club Edit) – 4:29

 1992 European promotional 12" single
"All Around the World" (Duet with Barry White) – 4:34

 2003 European promotional CD single
"All Around the World" – 4:22
"The Real Thing" – 4:20
"This Is the Right Time" – 4:31

 2003 US promotional 12" single (Norty Cotto Mixes)
"All Around The World" (Norty Cotto Remix) – 7:33   
"All Around The World" (Hosh Gonna Lookapella) – 2:40   
"All Around The World" (Lisa's Reprise) – 2:40   
"All Around The World" (Norty's World Dub) – 7:43   
"All Around The World" (Instrumental) – 7:33

 2003 US digital promo
"All Around The World" (Junior Vasquez Earth Anthem) – 10:50

 2006 US digital Dance Vault Mixes
"All Around The World" (Single Version) –  4:21   
"All Around The World" (American Club Edit) – 4:29   
"All Around The World" (Long Version) – 7:02   
"All Around The World" (American Club Remix) – 11:48

 Other remixes
"All Around the World" (Attack Mix) – 5:00

Charts

Weekly charts

Year-end charts

Decade-end charts

Certifications and sales

See also

List of number-one hits of 1990 (Austria)
VRT Top 30 number-one hits of 1990
List of RPM number-one dance singles of 1990
List of Dutch Top 40 number-one singles of 1990
VG-lista 1964 to 1994
List of number-one singles of 1990 (Spain)
List of UK Singles Chart number ones of the 1980s
List of number-one dance singles of 1990 (U.S.)
List of number-one R&B singles of 1990 (U.S.)

References

Lisa Stansfield songs
1989 singles
Songs written by Lisa Stansfield
Number-one singles in Austria
Number-one singles in Belgium
Dutch Top 40 number-one singles
Number-one singles in Greece
Number-one singles in Spain
UK Singles Chart number-one singles
1989 songs
Songs written by Ian Devaney
Arista Records singles
Songs written by Andy Morris (musician)
1990 singles
Torch songs